Denis Carey (6 August 1872 – 1 March 1947) was an Irish track and field athlete who competed for the United Kingdom of Great Britain and Ireland in the 1912 Summer Olympics. He was born in Limerick. In 1912 he finished sixth in the hammer throw competition.

References

External links
Profile
Denis Carey's profile at Sports Reference.com

1872 births
1947 deaths
Irish male hammer throwers
Olympic athletes of Great Britain
Athletes (track and field) at the 1912 Summer Olympics